A visit to the Art Dealer is an oil on copper made by Frans Francken the Younger in the 1600s. It is kept on Hallwyl Museum.

References

Flemish paintings
1600s paintings